Ajacuba  is a town and one of the 84 municipalities of Hidalgo, in central Mexico. The municipality covers an area of 192.7 km².

As of 2005, the municipality had a total population of 16,111.

Geography 

Ajacuba borders. It covers a total surface area of 192.7 km² at an altitude of 6,634 ft. In the year 2010 census by INEGI, it reported a population of 17,055.

The town of Ajacuba, a municipal seat, has governing jurisdiction over the following communities: Santiago Tezontlale, Vicente Guerrero, Tecomatlan, and Tulancalco. The total municipality extends 96.37 and borders with the municipalities of Tetepango, San Agustín Tlaxiaca, Atitalaquia, Atotonilco de Tula, Progreso de Obregón and the state of México (Hueypoxtla and Apaxco).

The municipal seat is in a small, elongated valley but most of the municipality is inside of the Mezquital Valley.

Climate

Tourism 
Ajacuba is a tourist destination, with 6 balnearios: "Ejidal Las Lumbreras", "Ajacuba", "La Carreta", "Los Arcos", "El Sol" and "Los Toboganes". The people who visit Ajacuba usually eat the regional dishes such as barbacoa, tlacoyos, tacos, etc.

Demography

Populated places in Ajacuba

References

Municipalities of Hidalgo (state)
Populated places in Hidalgo (state)
Populated places in the Teotlalpan
Nahua settlements